Akado Suzunosuke may refer to:

 Suzunosuke Akado, a 1957 film 
 Suzunosuke Akado: The Moonlight Monster, a 1957 film
 Suzunosuke Akado: Defeat the Demon-Faced Gang a 1957 film
 Suzunosuke Akado: The Vacuum Slash of Asuka, a 1957 film released as a double feature with The Invisible Man vs. The Human Fly
 Suzunosuke Akado: The One-Legged Demon, a 1957 film
 Suzunosuke Akado: The Birdman with Three Eyes, a 1958 film

See also 
 Super Giant